Wolwelange is a small town in the commune of Rambrouch, in western Luxembourg.  , the town has a population of 339.

Rambrouch
Towns in Luxembourg